Hurwitz's theorem can refer to several theorems named after Adolf Hurwitz:
 Hurwitz's theorem (complex analysis)
 Riemann–Hurwitz formula in algebraic geometry
 Hurwitz's theorem (composition algebras) on quadratic forms and nonassociative algebras
 Hurwitz's automorphisms theorem on Riemann surfaces
 Hurwitz's theorem (number theory)